Francis Lee Smith Jr. (October 6, 1845 – August 25, 1916) was an American lawyer and politician who served in the Virginia Senate and as a delegate to the Virginia Constitutional Convention of 1902, representing his native Alexandria.

References

External links

1845 births
1916 deaths
19th-century American politicians
20th-century American politicians
Politicians from Alexandria, Virginia
Virginia state senators